The Milan trolleybus system is part of the public transport network of Milan, Italy. In operation since 1933, the system presently comprises four routes.

History

A trolleybus system was established in Milan in 1933, with the opening of the short route 81 (Piazza Spotorno – Piazza Dergano).

In subsequent decades, the system developed rapidly, with the opening of radial and tangential routes.  The new external circular route (originally CE (circolare esterna), now 90/91) was built as a trolleybus line.

In the mid-1970s, it was intended to transform the 90/91 circular route into a light rail line, and abandon the rest of the trolleybus network. Many trolleybus routes were therefore converted into bus routes, and their overhead wires were removed.

Routes abandoned during the 1970s and 1980s were:
 81 and 82 (closed 27 September 1976);
 83 and MB (closed 25 October 1976);
 95 (closed 20 September 1977);
 96/97 (closed 5 March 1979);
 84 (closed 6 February 1984).

In subsequent years, following the abandonment of the proposal for the 90/91 tram line, there were no more interventions on the system, except for some limited changes to the routes.

Currently, efforts are focused on reducing journey times, with the construction of dedicated lanes. There are no plans to expand the system.

Service

The four routes are:

 90 clockwise circle line (Viale Isonzo - Lotto M1 - Viale Isonzo);
 91 counter-clockwise circle line (Viale Isonzo - Lotto M1 - Viale Isonzo);
 92 Viale Isonzo - Bovisa FN;
 93 Viale Omero - Lambrate M2.

Fleet

Milan's current trolleybus fleet is as follows:

 70 Socimi trolleybuses on Iveco chassis 2470 (nos. 901–970), many of which were sold or dismantled in 2008/2009 (ATM sold 23 vehicles to Ruse, Bulgaria);
 33 Socimi articulated trolleybuses on Iveco chassis 2480 (nos. 100–132);
 33 Bredabus articulated trolleybuses 4001 (nos. 200–232);
 8 Autodromo BusOtto articulated trolleybuses on MAN chassis (nos. 300–307);
 10 Irisbus Cristalis articulated trolleybuses (nos. 400–409);
 45 Van Hool AG300T articulated trolleybuses (nos. 700–744);
 30 Solaris Trollino 18-metre articulated trolleybuses (nos. 800–829).

Depots
There are presently two large trolleybus depots in Milan. The first depot is located in Viale Molise, east of the city.  This depot accommodates about 70 trolleybuses and 40 articulated trolleybuses.  The second depot is in the west of the city, and more specifically in Via Novara.  It hosts about 40 articulated trolleybuses.

Both depots are used not only for the storage of trolley buses, but also for diesel powered buses.  In contrast with the depots used solely for diesel buses, these depots are fully covered, for the better safeguarding of the fleet.

See also

Trams in Milan
List of trolleybus systems in Italy
Milan Metro

References

Notes

Further reading

External links

 Images of the Milan trolleybus system, at photorail.com
 Images of the Milan trolleybus system, at railfaneurope.net

This article is based upon a translation of the Italian language version as at March 2011.

Milan
Milan
Transport in Milan
1933 establishments in Italy